2-Methoxyethanol, or methyl cellosolve, is an organic compound with formula  that is used mainly as a solvent.  It is a clear, colorless liquid with an ether-like odor.  It is in a class of solvents known as glycol ethers which are notable for their ability to dissolve a variety of different types of chemical compounds and for their miscibility with water and other solvents.  It can be formed by the nucleophilic attack of methanol on protonated ethylene oxide followed by proton transfer:

 +  →  + 

2-Methoxyethanol is used as a solvent for many different purposes such as varnishes, dyes, and resins.  It is also used as an additive in airplane deicing solutions. In organometallic chemistry it is commonly used for the synthesis of Vaska's complex and related compounds such as carbonylchlorohydridotris(triphenylphosphine)ruthenium (II). During these reactions the alcohol acts as a source of hydride and carbon monoxide.

2-Methoxyethanol is toxic to the bone marrow and testicles. Workers exposed to high levels are at risk for granulocytopenia, macrocytic anemia, oligospermia, and azoospermia.

The methoxyethanol is converted by alcohol dehydrogenase into methoxyacetic acid which is the substance which causes the harmful effects. Both ethanol and acetate have a protecting effect. The methoxyacetate can enter the Krebs cycle where it forms methoxycitrate.

References

Glycol ethers
Primary alcohols